The 2019–20 Yale Bulldogs men's basketball team represent Yale University in the 2019–20 NCAA Division I men's basketball season. The Bulldogs, led by 21st-year head coach James Jones, play their home games at John J. Lee Amphitheater of the Payne Whitney Gymnasium in New Haven, Connecticut as members of the Ivy League. The Bulldogs earned the league's automatic berth to the NCAA tournament by being the regular season conference champions, after it was announced on March 10, 2020 that the Ivy League tournament was canceled due to the COVID-19 pandemic.

Previous season
The Bulldogs finished the 2018–19 season 22–8 overall, 10–4 in Ivy League play, finishing as co-regular season champions, alongside Harvard. In the Ivy League tournament, they defeated Princeton in the semifinals, before defeating Harvard in the championship game, earning the Ivy League's automatic bid into the NCAA tournament. As the 14 seed in the East Region, they were defeated in the first round by 3rd-seeded LSU.

Roster

Schedule and results

|-
!colspan=12 style=| Non-conference regular season

|-
!colspan=12 style=| Ivy League regular season

|-
!colspan=12 style=| Ivy League tournament
|-

|-
!colspan=9 style=|NCAA Tournament

|-

Source

References

Yale Bulldogs men's basketball seasons
Yale
Yale Bulldogs men's basketball
Yale Bulldogs men's basketball